James Robson (1733–1806) was an English printer and bookseller. He was born in Sebergham, Cumberland.

The title page of the 1766 edition of State Worthies by David Lloyd says: "Printed for J Robson, Bookseller to her Royal Highness the Princess Dowager of Wales, in New Bond-Street."

Publications
Supplemental volume to Denton, Revd Thomas, New Biographical Dictionary, 1764
Gilpin, William, Essay on Prints, 1765 (First edition) 
Lloyd, David, State Worthies, 1766. Revised by Charles Whitworth
Jerningham, Edward, The Deserter, 1770
Cumberland, Richard, Odes, 1776.

References

External Links
Landon, Richard, Robson, James (1733–1806), Oxford Dictionary of National Biography, 2012. (Access via libraries).
Dictionary of National Biography, 1885-1900/Robson, James (Wikisource)
WorldCat: Robson, James 1733-1806

Bookselling
1806 deaths
1733 births
English printers
English booksellers